Meet You There is an album by British folk rock group Oysterband, released in April 2007.

Track listing 
 "Over the Water"
 "Here Comes the Flood"
 "Where the World Divides"
 "Walking Down the Road with You"
 "Bury Me Standing"
 "Everything Must Go"
 "Control"
 "The Boy's Still Running"
 "Someone Somewhere"
 "Just One Life"
 "Dancing as Fast as I Can"

2007 albums
Oysterband albums